Utopia High School or Utopia School is a public high school located in Utopia, Texas, US, and classified as a 1A school by the University Interscholastic League. It is part of the Utopia Independent School District located in extreme northeast Uvalde County. In 2015, the school was rated "Met Standard" by the Texas Education Agency.

Athletics
The Utopia Buffalos compete in the following sports:

Basketball
Cross Country
Golf
Tennis
Track and field
Volleyball

State Titles
Boys' Cross Country
1992 (1A)
Girls' Track
1974 (B)
Girls' Cross Country 
2014 (1A)
Boys' Track – High Jump
2015 (1A)
Girls' Doubles Tennis
2016 (1A)

References

External links
Utopia ISD

Public high schools in Texas
Schools in Uvalde County, Texas